A Road in the city of Qatif in the Eastern Province of Saudi Arabia, the western part of it is locally known as 'Hadlah'.

Oil pipelines coming from Abqaiq heading to Ras Tanura run underneath the road, which prevents the construction of buildings near that 800-meter part of the road.  

Many facilities and services located on the road. Public facilities includes the city main power station as well as the water tower and administration. Shops includes Giant Stores and City Plaza are located there. Restaurants including a KFC and  Pizza Hut are located on the road in Tarout Island.

See also
 Transport in Saudi Arabia

Roads in Saudi Arabia